General Abdul Wahid Baba Jan, an ethnic Tajik from Parwan Province and better known simply as "General Babajan", is a former member of the People's Democratic Party of Afghanistan during the presidency of Dr. Najibullah. Abdul-Wahid participated in the 1979 USSR invasion of Afghanistan when he secretly supported the takeover of Kabul.

He was promoted to General and was the commander of the Kabul Garrison during the fall of Dr. Najibullah's government until he joined the forces of Ahmed Shah Massoud and Shura-e Nazar, where he was a member of the senior command. According to some sources he was in charge of directing the long-range rockets used against Hezbe Wahdat and Hezb-i Islami. The same report states that a battalion commander under his command, Habiburahman Parandi, controlled the areas above Kart-i-Sakhi hill up to a part of Ministry of Agriculture and commanded an artillery battery. Units under his command were also involved in the massacres at Afshar.

After the defeat of the Mujahideen, General Babajan joined the Northern Alliance. In October 2001, when the attacks against the Taliban by American forces began, General Babajan was controlling approximately 2000 forces at Bagram Airbase. Following the fall of the Taliban he was appointed as Chief of Police for Kabul in 2003 replacing Abdul Baseer Salangi. In 2005 he was transferred to Herat. He has since retired from official politics and moved to business, and was able to secure a lucrative contract to supply forces at Bagram Airbase.

References

Living people
People's Democratic Party of Afghanistan politicians
People from Parwan Province
Jamiat-e Islami politicians
Afghan Tajik people
1953 births